The Pine Ridge Hospital (also known as the Pine Ridge Apartments) is a historic hospital in West Palm Beach, Florida that served as a hospital during 1923 to 1956. It is located at 1401 Division Avenue.

The hospital was designed by West Palm Beach architects Harvey & Clarke and is not special architecturally.
The hospital building was deemed historically significant at a local level for its role as the sole hospital serving African-Americans in West Palm Beach in the period up to the ending of segregation in the 1960s.  It "was a well-known institution among blacks throughout the South" during the 1920s and 1930s.

On January 26, 2001, it was added to the U.S. National Register of Historic Places.

It is included in the Northwest Historic District.

References

 Palm Beach County listings at National Register of Historic Places

Hospitals in Florida
Defunct hospitals in Florida
National Register of Historic Places in Palm Beach County, Florida
Hospital buildings on the National Register of Historic Places in Florida
Hospitals established in 1923
African-American history of Florida
Buildings and structures in Palm Beach County, Florida
Historically black hospitals in the United States
Hospitals disestablished in 1956